Marko Trbić (born August 16, 1974) is a Bosnian professional basketball coach. He currently serves as a youth coach and a sports director for Spars Realway of the Basketball Championship of Bosnia and Herzegovina.

Coaching career
In October 2010, Trbić became a head coach for Spars Sarajevo. In April 2018, he was named a sports director for Spars. In August 2019, he became the head of the youth selection and coach for the U18 and U20 teams.

References

External links 
Marko Trbić at ABA 2
 Marko Trbic at eurobasket.com

1974 births
Living people
Bosnia and Herzegovina basketball coaches
OKK Spars coaches
Sportspeople from Zenica